Rukavishnikovo is a rural locality (a village) in Shemgogodskoye Rural Settlement, Velikoustyugsky District, Vologda Oblast, Russia. The population was 43 as of 2002.

Geography 
Rukavishnikovo is located 10 km southeast of Veliky Ustyug (the district's administrative centre) by road. Kopylovo is the nearest rural locality.

References 

Rural localities in Velikoustyugsky District